Now Here This is an album by John McLaughlin and The 4th Dimension, released in 2012 through the record label Abstract Logix.
The album reached number 25 on Billboard's Jazz Albums charts.

Track listing
All tracks written by John McLaughlin.
 "Trancefusion" – 7:16
 "Riff Raff" – 7:02
 "Echoes from Then" – 6:07
 "Wonderfall" – 6:27
 "Call and Answer" – 5:53
 "Not Here Not There" – 6:16
 "Guitar Love" – 7:08
 "Take It or Leave It" – 3:46

Personnel
 Ranjit Barot – drums
 Gary Husband – drums, piano, synthesizer
 Étienne M'Bappé – electric bass, fretless bass
 John McLaughlin – electric guitar, synthesizer guitar

Other credits
 Frédéric Betin – engineer
 Marcus Wippersberg – engineer, mastering, mixing

References

2012 albums
John McLaughlin (musician) albums
Abstract Logix albums